Pannonia Prima was an ancient Roman province. It was formed in the year 296, during the reign of Emperor Diocletian. Previously, it was a part of the province of Pannonia Superior, which, along with Pannonia Inferior, was gradually divided into four administrative units: Pannonia Prima, Pannonia Secunda, Valeria, and Savia. This transition was completed by the time of Constantine.

Geography
Pannonia Prima included parts of present-day Hungary, Austria, Croatia, Slovenia, and Slovakia. Its capital was Savaria (modern Szombathely), a city built during the reign of Claudius. This city was located on an important junction between the Amber Road connecting Italy with Hungary and the road between Treveris and Sirmium. Other important cities were Vindobona (modern Vienna;  in German), and Scarbantia (modern Sopron). The city of Sirmium in Pannonia Secunda had administrative oversight over all of the newly created Diocese of Pannonia, along with Dalmatia and Noricum.

Pannonia Prima was the northwestern quadrant of the four subdivisions of Pannonia. It was bordered on the west by the Alps, which stretch from the Danube River to the Adriatic Sea, and belonged to the provinces of Noricum. It is bordered on the north by the Danube and on the south by the Drava river. In the east, it is divided from Valeria by an arbitrary north-south border which is tangent to the east end of lacus Pelso (Lake Balaton). On the other hand, was the fort of Valcum (modern Fenékpuszta), close to the Sirmium-Savaria road. This fort is dated to the Constantian era, and is a center of imperial latifundia. The only Pannonian frontier border was that of the Danube, and it was easily defensible; thus, there were few forts lining that border.

Decline and Fall

Roman money had ceased circulating in all Pannonia north of the Drave (including Pannonia Prima) by 375, indicating that little Roman influence remained in the area. The foederati and Visigothic and Hunnic barbarians caused trouble, and the situation in Pannonia was described by Claudian as "a continual siege" in 399. Pannonia Prima held out under Generidus, but was eventually assimilated into the Huns' territory by 427. Rome would never regain effective control of this area, but nominally remained a Roman province, until the fall of the Ostrogothic Kingdom in 553.

See also
 March of Pannonia

References

Literature

 
 
 

Prima
Late Roman provinces
Pannonia Superior
Croatia in the Roman era
Illyricum (Roman province)
Slovenia in the Roman era
States and territories established in the 290s
States and territories disestablished in the 5th century
290s establishments in the Roman Empire
296 establishments
5th-century disestablishments in the Roman Empire